The following is a list of players, both past and current, who appeared at least in one game for the Milwaukee Bucks NBA franchise.



Players
Note: Statistics were updated through the end of the  season.

A

|-
|align="left"| || align="center"|F/C || align="left"|Duke || align="center"|1 || align="center"| || 12 || 159 || 37 || 10 || 64 || 13.3 || 3.1 || 0.8 || 5.3 || align=center|
|-
|align="left"| || align="center"|F/C || align="left"|Iowa State || align="center"|2 || align="center"|– || 109 || 2,474 || 981 || 95 || 913 || 22.7 || 9.0 || 0.9 || 8.4 || align=center|
|-
|align="left" bgcolor="#FFFF99"| (formerly Lew Alcindor)^ (#33) || align="center"|C || align="left"|UCLA || align="center"|6 || align="center"|– || 467 || 19,954 || bgcolor="#CFECEC"|7,161 || 2,008 || bgcolor="#CFECEC"|14,211 || bgcolor="#CFECEC"|42.7 || bgcolor="#CFECEC"|15.3 || 4.3 || bgcolor="#CFECEC"|30.4 || align=center|
|-
|align="left"| || align="center"|G || align="left"|St. Bonaventure || align="center"|1 || align="center"| ||  || || || || || || || ||  || align=center|
|-
|align="left"| || align="center"|F || align="left"|UConn || align="center"|1 || align="center"| || 28 || 705 || 218 || 31 || 305 || 25.2 || 7.8 || 1.1 || 10.9 || align=center|
|-
|align="left"| || align="center"|F || align="left"|West Virginia || align="center"|1 || align="center"| || 59 || 716 || 115 || 42 || 278 || 12.1 || 1.9 || 0.7 || 4.7 || align=center|
|-
|align="left" bgcolor="#CCFFCC"|x || align="center"|G || align="left"|Duke || align="center"|1 || align="center"| ||  || || || || || || || ||  || align=center|
|-
|align="left"| || align="center"|G || align="left"|UCLA || align="center"|5 || align="center"|– || 303 || 8,901 || 1,007 || 1,347 || 4,185 || 29.4 || 3.3 || 4.4 || 13.8 || align=center|
|-
|align="left"| || align="center"|F/C || align="left"|Villanova || align="center"|1 || align="center"| || 49 || 579 || 103 || 35 || 156 || 11.8 || 2.1 || 0.7 || 3.2 || align=center|
|-
|align="left" bgcolor="#FFFF99"|^ || align="center"|G || align="left"|UConn || align="center"|7 || align="center"|– || 494 || 17,945 || 2,260 || 1,861 || 9,681 || 36.3 || 4.6 || 3.8 || 19.6 || align=center|
|-
|align="left"| || align="center"|G || align="left"|Fresno State || align="center"|3 || align="center"|– || 114 || 1,249 || 126 || 281 || 314 || 11.0 || 1.1 || 2.5 || 2.8 || align=center|
|-
|align="left"| || align="center"|F/C || align="left"|Houston || align="center"|2 || align="center"|– || 86 || 1,538 || 448 || 27 || 599 || 17.9 || 5.2 || 0.3 || 7.0 || align=center|
|-
|align="left" bgcolor="#FBCEB1"|* || align="center"|G/F || align="left"|Greece || align="center"|6 || align="center"|– || 465 || 15,220 || 3,844 || 1,921 || 8,745 || 32.7 || 8.3 || 4.1 || 18.8 || align=center|
|-
|align="left" bgcolor="#CCFFCC"|x || align="center"|F || align="left"|Greece || align="center"|1 || align="center"| ||  || || || || || || || ||  || align=center|
|-
|align="left"| || align="center"|G || align="left"|UNLV || align="center"|1 || align="center"| || 24 || 553 || 44 || 79 || 172 || 23.0 || 1.8 || 3.3 || 7.2 || align=center|
|-
|align="left" bgcolor="#FFFF99"|^ || align="center"|G || align="left"|UTEP || align="center"|1 || align="center"| || 46 || 1,038 || 76 || 160 || 340 || 22.6 || 1.7 || 3.5 || 7.4 || align=center|
|-
|align="left"| || align="center"|G || align="left"|Tulane || align="center"|1 || align="center"| || 11 || 86 || 14 || 17 || 35 || 7.8 || 1.3 || 1.5 || 3.2 || align=center|
|-
|align="left"| || align="center"|G || align="left"|Texas || align="center"|1 || align="center"| ||  || || || || || || || ||  || align=center|
|-
|align="left"| || align="center"|F || align="left"|Seton Hall || align="center"|2 || align="center"|– || 115 || 2,980 || 666 || 124 || 1,051 || 25.9 || 5.8 || 1.1 || 9.1 || align=center|
|-
|align="left"| || align="center"|C || align="left"|Mexico || align="center"|1 || align="center"| || 12 || 163 || 59 || 12 || 51 || 13.6 || 4.9 || 1.0 || 4.3 || align=center|
|}

B

|-
|align="left" bgcolor="#FFCC00"|+ || align="center"|F || align="left"|Hartford || align="center"|4 || align="center"|– || 324 || 12,399 || 3,079 || 882 || 5,922 || 38.3 || 9.5 || 2.7 || 18.3 || align=center|
|-
|align="left"| || align="center"|C || align="left"|Memphis || align="center"|1 || align="center"| || 7 || 85 || 22 || 4 || 36 || 12.1 || 3.1 || 0.6 || 5.1 || align=center|
|-
|align="left"| || align="center"|G || align="left"|Georgia Tech || align="center"|3 || align="center"|– || 171 || 2,396 || 238 || 321 || 842 || 14.0 || 1.4 || 1.9 || 4.9 || align=center|
|-
|align="left"| || align="center"|G || align="left"|Arizona || align="center"|2 || align="center"|– || 129 || 3,222 || 352 || 396 || 1,139 || 25.0 || 2.7 || 3.1 || 8.8 || align=center|
|-
|align="left"| || align="center"|F || align="left"|Kansas State || align="center"|1 || align="center"| || 56 || 935 || 193 || 53 || 528 || 16.7 || 3.4 || 0.9 || 9.4 || align=center|
|-
|align="left" bgcolor="#CCFFCC"|x || align="center"|G || align="left"|Yakima Valley || align="center"|1 || align="center"| ||  || || || || || || || ||  || align=center|
|-
|align="left"| || align="center"|G || align="left"|Michigan State || align="center"|5 || align="center"|– || 350 || 9,153 || 791 || 842 || 3,164 || 26.2 || 2.3 || 2.4 || 9.0 || align=center|
|-
|align="left"| || align="center"|F/G || align="left"|Saint Joseph's || align="center"|1 || align="center"| ||  || || || || || || || ||  || align=center|
|-
|align="left"| || align="center"|F || align="left"|Croatia || align="center"|1 || align="center"| ||  || || || || || || || ||  || align=center|
|-
|align="left"| || align="center"|C || align="left"|Creighton || align="center"|1 || align="center"| || 70 || 1,492 || 436 || 48 || 547 || 21.3 || 6.2 || 0.7 || 7.8 || align=center|
|-
|align="left"| || align="center"|C || align="left"|Indiana || align="center"|3 || align="center"|– || 207 || 4,809 || 1,212 || 430 || 2,030 || 23.2 || 5.9 || 2.1 || 9.8 || align=center|
|-
|align="left"| || align="center"|G || align="left"|California (PA) || align="center"|1 || align="center"| || 1 || 1 || 0 || 0 || 0 || 1.0 || 0.0 || 0.0 || 0.0 || align=center|
|-
|align="left"| || align="center"|G || align="left"|Maryland || align="center"|1 || align="center"| || 33 || 583 || 45 || 84 || 120 || 17.7 || 1.4 || 2.5 || 3.6 || align=center|
|-
|align="left"| || align="center"|G || align="left"|Kentucky || align="center"|2 || align="center"|– || 149 || 4,511 || 639 || 791 || 2,507 || 30.3 || 4.3 || 5.3 || 16.8 || align=center|
|-
|align="left"| || align="center"|F/C || align="left"|USC || align="center"|1 || align="center"| || 79 || 1,524 || 410 || 95 || 672 || 19.3 || 5.2 || 1.2 || 8.5 || align=center|
|-
|align="left"| || align="center"|G/F || align="left"|Kentucky || align="center"|1 || align="center"| || 29 || 485 || 91 || 33 || 175 || 16.7 || 3.1 || 1.1 || 6.0 || align=center|
|-
|align="left"| || align="center"|C || align="left"|Utah || align="center"|7 || align="center"|– || 408 || 13,340 || 3,810 || 950 || 5,179 || 32.7 || 9.3 || 2.3 || 12.7 || align=center|
|-
|align="left"| || align="center"|F || align="left"|Weber State || align="center"|1 || align="center"| || 6 || 38 || 10 || 0 || 9 || 6.3 || 1.7 || 0.0 || 1.5 || align=center|
|-
|align="left"| || align="center"|C || align="left"|Penn State || align="center"|1 || align="center"| || 17 || 189 || 49 || 4 || 42 || 11.1 || 2.9 || 0.2 || 2.5 || align=center|
|-
|align="left"| || align="center"|F || align="left"|Kansas State || align="center"|1 || align="center"| || 80 || 1,775 || 435 || 128 || 728 || 22.2 || 5.4 || 1.6 || 9.1 || align=center|
|-
|align="left"| || align="center"|G || align="left"|Eastern Michigan || align="center"|2 || align="center"| || 92 || 2,016 || 131 || 300 || 897 || 21.9 || 1.4 || 3.3 || 9.8 || align=center|
|-
|align="left"| || align="center"|G/F || align="left"|North Carolina || align="center"|2 || align="center"|– || 70 || 905 || 103 || 67 || 212 || 12.9 || 1.5 || 1.0 || 3.0 || align=center|
|-
|align="left"| || align="center"|G || align="left"|Oregon || align="center"|2 || align="center"|– || 65 || 2,289 || 229 || 491 || 1,044 || 35.2 || 3.5 || bgcolor="#CFECEC"|7.6 || 16.1 || align=center|
|-
|align="left"| || align="center"|F || align="left"|Wyoming || align="center"|1 || align="center"| || 6 || 30 || 2 || 2 || 10 || 5.0 || 0.3 || 0.3 || 1.7 || align=center|
|-
|align="left"| || align="center"|C || align="left"|Minnesota || align="center"|7 || align="center"|– || 452 || 8,139 || 1,986 || 356 || 3,238 || 18.0 || 4.4 || 0.8 || 7.2 || align=center|
|-
|align="left"| || align="center"|C || align="left"|Slovenia || align="center"|1 || align="center"| || 14 || 59 || 13 || 1 || 14 || 4.2 || 0.9 || 0.1 || 1.0 || align=center|
|-
|align="left"| || align="center"|F/C || align="left"|Penn State || align="center"|4 || align="center"|– || 249 || 6,984 || 1,454 || 614 || 3,450 || 28.0 || 5.8 || 2.5 || 13.9 || align=center|
|-
|align="left"| (#2) || align="center"|G/F || align="left"|Louisville || align="center"|10 || align="center"|– || bgcolor="#CFECEC"|711 || 18,054 || 2,642 || 1,787 || 9,892 || 25.4 || 3.7 || 2.5 || 13.9 || align=center|
|-
|align="left"| || align="center"|F || align="left"|Washington || align="center"|2 || align="center"|– || 98 || 916 || 259 || 27 || 173 || 9.3 || 2.6 || 0.3 || 1.8 || align=center|
|-
|align="left"| || align="center"|G || align="left"|Virginia || align="center"|3 || align="center"|– || 187 || 5,250 || 657 || 674 || 2,393 || 28.1 || 3.5 || 3.6 || 12.8 || align=center|
|-
|align="left"| || align="center"|G || align="left"|Notre Dame || align="center"|3 || align="center"|– || 189 || 3,998 || 336 || 578 || 1,592 || 21.2 || 1.8 || 3.1 || 8.4 || align=center|
|-
|align="left"| || align="center"|F || align="left"|NC State || align="center"|1 || align="center"| || 60 || 674 || 132 || 24 || 170 || 11.2 || 2.2 || 0.4 || 2.8 || align=center|
|-
|align="left"| || align="center"|G || align="left"|SMU || align="center"|2 || align="center"|– || 112 || 1,810 || 327 || 109 || 589 || 16.2 || 2.9 || 1.0 || 5.3 || align=center|
|-
|align="left"| || align="center"|G/F || align="left"|Arkansas || align="center"|2 || align="center"|– || 90 || 909 || 101 || 62 || 311 || 10.1 || 1.1 || 0.7 || 3.5 || align=center|
|-
|align="left" | || align="center"|G || align="left"|BYU || align="center"|1 || align="center"| ||  || || || || || || || ||  || align=center|
|-
|align="left"| || align="center"|G || align="left"|Indiana || align="center"|6 || align="center"|– || 461 || 12,154 || 1,507 || 2,391 || 4,738 || 26.4 || 3.3 || 5.2 || 10.3 || align=center|
|-
|align="left"| || align="center"|F || align="left"|UConn || align="center"|1 || align="center"| || 34 || 821 || 158 || 56 || 374 || 24.1 || 4.6 || 1.6 || 11.0 || align=center|
|}

C

|-
|align="left"| || align="center"|F || align="left"|Alabama || align="center"|3 || align="center"|– || 144 || 2,637 || 579 || 103 || 894 || 18.3 || 4.0 || 0.7 || 6.2 || align=center|
|-
|align="left"| || align="center"|G || align="left"|Murray State || align="center"|1 || align="center"| || 4 || 31 || 4 || 3 || 6 || 7.8 || 1.0 || 0.8 || 1.5 || align=center|
|-
|align="left"| || align="center"|F/C || align="left"|Virginia Tech || align="center"|1 || align="center"| || 4 || 21 || 4 || 0 || 5 || 5.3 || 1.0 || 0.0 || 1.3 || align=center|
|-
|align="left"| || align="center"|G/F || align="left"|Mount St. Mary's || align="center"|1 || align="center"| || 47 || 875 || 93 || 104 || 390 || 18.6 || 2.0 || 2.2 || 8.3 || align=center|
|-
|align="left" bgcolor="#CCFFCC"|x || align="center"|G || align="left"|West Virginia || align="center"|1 || align="center"| ||  || || || || || || || ||  || align=center|
|-
|align="left"| || align="center"|G || align="left"|Syracuse || align="center"|2 || align="center"|– || 79 || 2,407 || 375 || 421 || 976 || 30.5 || 4.7 || 5.3 || 12.4 || align=center|
|-
|align="left"| || align="center"|G || align="left"|Florida State || align="center"|5 || align="center"|– || 313 || 11,012 || 1,254 || 2,269 || 5,939 || 35.2 || 4.0 || 7.2 || 19.0 || align=center|
|-
|align="left"| || align="center"|F/C || align="left"|Hardin–Simmons || align="center"|5 || align="center"|– || 372 || 7,314 || 1,918 || 398 || 1,175 || 19.7 || 5.2 || 1.1 || 3.2 || align=center|
|-
|align="left"| || align="center"|F/C || align="left"|Wake Forest || align="center"|2 || align="center"|– || 155 || 3,341 || 913 || 151 || 1,789 || 21.6 || 5.9 || 1.0 || 11.5 || align=center|
|-
|align="left"| || align="center"|F || align="left"|Maryland || align="center"|1 || align="center"| || 22 || 305 || 87 || 12 || 126 || 13.9 || 4.0 || 0.5 || 5.7 || align=center|
|-
|align="left"| || align="center"|G/F || align="left"|Washington State || align="center"|1 || align="center"| || 6 || 57 || 15 || 2 || 25 || 9.5 || 2.5 || 0.3 || 4.2 || align=center|
|-
|align="left"| || align="center"|F || align="left"|Notre Dame || align="center"|1 || align="center"| || 8 || 98 || 30 || 3 || 39 || 12.3 || 3.8 || 0.4 || 4.9 || align=center|
|-
|align="left"| || align="center"|F/C || align="left"|Providence || align="center"|2 || align="center"|– || 156 || 3,022 || 603 || 178 || 1,210 || 19.4 || 3.9 || 1.1 || 7.8 || align=center|
|-
|align="left" bgcolor="#CCFFCC"|x || align="center"|G || align="left"|Notre Dame || align="center"|1 || align="center"| || 61 || 1,261 || 258 || 122 || 421 || 20.7 || 4.2 || 2.0 || 6.9 || align=center|
|-
|align="left"| || align="center"|G || align="left"|Oregon State || align="center"|2 || align="center"|– || 120 || 1,939 || 239 || 401 || 402 || 16.2 || 2.0 || 3.3 || 3.4 || align=center|
|-
|align="left"| || align="center"|F/C || align="left"|Arizona || align="center"|1 || align="center"| || 23 || 201 || 56 || 4 || 62 || 8.7 || 2.4 || 0.2 || 2.7 || align=center|
|-
|align="left"| || align="center"|F || align="left"|Colorado || align="center"|1 || align="center"| || 24 || 156 || 10 || 11 || 50 || 6.5 || 0.4 || 0.5 || 2.1 || align=center|
|-
|align="left"| || align="center"|F || align="left"|Southern Miss || align="center"|1 || align="center"| || 19 || 177 || 29 || 6 || 65 || 9.3 || 1.5 || 0.3 || 3.4 || align=center|
|-
|align="left"| || align="center"|C || align="left"|Kentucky || align="center"|1 || align="center"| ||  || || || || || || || ||  || align=center|
|-
|align="left" bgcolor="#FFFF99"|^ || align="center"|F/C || align="left"|Florida State || align="center"|1 || align="center"| || 40 || 1,014 || 274 || 82 || 324 || 25.4 || 6.9 || 2.1 || 8.1 || align=center|
|-
|align="left"| || align="center"|G/F || align="left"|St. Bonaventure || align="center"|1 || align="center"| || 77 || 1,331 || 184 || 225 || 587 || 17.3 || 2.4 || 2.9 || 7.6 || align=center|
|-
|align="left"| || align="center"|G || align="left"|New Mexico State || align="center"|2 || align="center"|– || 72 || 1,029 || 88 || 144 || 442 || 14.3 || 1.2 || 2.0 || 6.1 || align=center|
|-
|align="left"| || align="center"|C || align="left"|North Carolina || align="center"|1 || align="center"| || 35 || 203 || 41 || 13 || 28 || 5.8 || 1.2 || 0.4 || 0.8 || align=center|
|-
|align="left"| || align="center"|F || align="left"|Providence || align="center"|1 || align="center"| || 11 || 77 || 24 || 6 || 36 || 7.0 || 2.2 || 0.5 || 3.3 || align=center|
|-
|align="left"| || align="center"|F || align="left"|USC Upstate || align="center"|1 || align="center"| ||  || || || || || || || ||  || align=center|
|-
|align="left" bgcolor="#CCFFCC"|x || align="center"|F || align="left"|Marquette || align="center"|1 || align="center"| ||  || || || || || || || ||  || align=center|
|-
|align="left"| || align="center"|F/C || align="left"|Cincinnati || align="center"|3 || align="center"|– || 223 || 3,116 || 775 || 214 || 1,568 || 14.0 || 3.5 || 1.0 || 7.0 || align=center|
|-
|align="left" bgcolor="#FFCC00"|+ || align="center"|F || align="left"|DePaul || align="center"|6 || align="center"|– || 480 || 15,391 || 3,758 || 1,118 || 9,290 || 32.1 || 7.8 || 2.3 || 19.4 || align=center|
|-
|align="left"| || align="center"|C || align="left"|Murray State || align="center"|6 || align="center"|–– || 295 || 3,072 || 1,081 || 164 || 841 || 10.4 || 3.7 || 0.6 || 2.9 || align=center|
|-
|align="left"| || align="center"|G || align="left"|Oregon State || align="center"|1 || align="center"| || 4 || 55 || 9 || 1 || 16 || 13.8 || 2.3 || 0.3 || 4.0 || align=center|
|-
|align="left"| || align="center"|G || align="left"|Virginia Tech || align="center"|1 || align="center"| || 42 || 864 || 85 || 48 || 423 || 20.6 || 2.0 || 1.1 || 10.1 || align=center|
|-
|align="left"| || align="center"|G/F || align="left"|Georgia Southern || align="center"|2 || align="center"|– || 132 || 3,124 || 206 || 215 || 787 || 23.7 || 1.6 || 1.6 || 6.0 || align=center|
|}

D

|-
|align="left"| || align="center"|C || align="left"|Seton Hall || align="center"|1 || align="center"| || 47 || 765 || 276 || 21 || 313 || 16.3 || 5.9 || 0.4 || 6.7 || align=center|
|-
|align="left" bgcolor="#FFCC00"|+ (#10) || align="center"|G/F || align="left"|Norfolk State || align="center"|9 || align="center"|– || 618 || bgcolor="#CFECEC"|22,094 || 4,497 || 1,956 || 11,478 || 35.8 || 7.3 || 3.2 || 18.6 || align=center|
|-
|align="left"| || align="center"|G/F || align="left"|Auburn || align="center"|1 || align="center"| || 59 || 1,085 || 150 || 65 || 324 || 18.4 || 2.5 || 1.1 || 5.5 || align=center|
|-
|align="left" bgcolor="#FFFF99"|^ || align="center"|G/F || align="left"|Notre Dame || align="center"|1 || align="center"| || 10 || 126 || 13 || 9 || 57 || 12.6 || 1.3 || 0.9 || 5.7 || align=center|
|-
|align="left"| || align="center"|F || align="left"|Vanderbilt || align="center"|3 || align="center"|– || 119 || 1,658 || 322 || 108 || 803 || 13.9 || 2.7 || 0.9 || 6.7 || align=center|
|-
|align="left"| || align="center"|F || align="left"|Wyoming || align="center"|1 || align="center"| || 4 || 12 || 3 || 1 || 2 || 3.0 || 0.8 || 0.3 || 0.5 || align=center|
|-
|align="left"| || align="center"|G/F || align="left"|Old Dominion || align="center"|1 || align="center"| || 31 || 251 || 36 || 14 || 123 || 8.1 || 1.2 || 0.5 || 4.0 || align=center|
|-
|align="left"| || align="center"|G/F || align="left"|Duquesne || align="center"|5 || align="center"|– || 286 || 3,711 || 800 || 295 || 1,478 || 13.0 || 2.8 || 1.0 || 5.2 || align=center|
|-
|align="left"| || align="center"|G/F || align="left"|Arkansas || align="center"|4 || align="center"|– || 237 || 6,946 || 945 || 394 || 3,332 || 29.3 || 4.0 || 1.7 || 14.1 || align=center|
|-
|align="left"| || align="center"|G || align="left"|NC State || align="center"|2 || align="center"|– || 115 || 2,304 || 209 || 334 || 630 || 20.0 || 1.8 || 2.9 || 5.5 || align=center|
|-
|align="left"| || align="center"|C || align="left"|Duke || align="center"|1 || align="center"| ||  || || || || || || || ||  || align=center|
|-
|align="left"| || align="center"|G || align="left"|Argentina || align="center"|3 || align="center"|– || 178 || 5,406 || 802 || 437 || 1,878 || 30.4 || 4.5 || 2.5 || 10.6 || align=center|
|-
|align="left"| || align="center"|G || align="left"|Saint Mary's || align="center"|3 || align="center"|– || 126 || 2,795 || 221 || 531 || 761 || 22.2 || 1.8 || 4.2 || 6.0 || align=center|
|-
|align="left"| || align="center"|F || align="left"|Virginia || align="center"|1 || align="center"| ||  || || || || || || || ||  || align=center|
|-
|align="left"| || align="center"|F || align="left"|New Mexico Highlands || align="center"|1 || align="center"| || 23 || 144 || 32 || 9 || 37 || 6.3 || 1.4 || 0.4 || 1.6 || align=center|
|-
|align="left" | || align="center"|G || align="left"|Villanova || align="center"|1 || align="center"| || 27 || 411 || 65 || 31 || 131 || 15.2 || 2.4 || 1.1 || 4.9 || align=center|
|-
|align="left"| || align="center"|G || align="left"|Missouri || align="center"|1 || align="center"| || 80 || 1,757 || 117 || 243 || 571 || 22.0 || 1.5 || 3.0 || 7.1 || align=center|
|-
|align="left"| || align="center"|G || align="left"|Syracuse || align="center"|2 || align="center"|– || 148 || 4,417 || 350 || 824 || 1,556 || 29.8 || 2.4 || 5.6 || 10.5 || align=center|
|-
|align="left"| || align="center"|G || align="left"|Memphis || align="center"|1 || align="center"| || 44 || 884 || 88 || 50 || 323 || 20.1 || 2.0 || 1.1 || 7.3 || align=center|
|-
|align="left"| || align="center"|F || align="left"|Boston College || align="center"|3 || align="center"|– || 134 || 1,708 || 512 || 112 || 536 || 12.7 || 3.8 || 0.8 || 4.0 || align=center|
|-
|align="left"| || align="center"|C || align="left"|Eastern Illinois || align="center"|1 || align="center"| || 8 || 58 || 7 || 2 || 9 || 7.3 || 0.9 || 0.3 || 1.1 || align=center|
|-
|align="left"| || align="center"|G/F || align="left"|Boston College || align="center"|1 || align="center"| || 72 || 1,717 || 220 || 130 || 518 || 23.8 || 3.1 || 1.8 || 7.2 || align=center|
|-
|align="left"| || align="center"|G || align="left"|South Carolina || align="center"|4 || align="center"|–– || 43 || 885 || 61 || 173 || 380 || 20.6 || 1.4 || 4.0 || 8.8 || align=center|
|-
|align="left"| || align="center"|G/F || align="left"|Duke || align="center"|2 || align="center"|– || 130 || 3,388 || 495 || 262 || 1,462 || 26.1 || 3.8 || 2.0 || 11.2 || align=center|
|-
|align="left"| || align="center"|G || align="left"|Duke || align="center"|1 || align="center"| || 3 || 6 || 1 || 2 || 5 || 2.0 || 0.3 || 0.7 || 1.7 || align=center|
|}

E to F

|-
|align="left"| || align="center"|C || align="left"|BYU || align="center"|1 || align="center"| || 17 || 155 || 29 || 12 || 49 || 9.1 || 1.7 || 0.7 || 2.9 || align=center|
|-
|align="left"| || align="center"|F/C || align="left"|Iowa || align="center"|1 || align="center"| || 9 || 43 || 11 || 2 || 26 || 4.8 || 1.2 || 0.2 || 2.9 || align=center|
|-
|align="left"| || align="center"|G/F || align="left"|East Carolina || align="center"|2 || align="center"|– || 164 || 5,051 || 711 || 385 || 2,335 || 30.8 || 4.3 || 2.3 || 14.2 || align=center|
|-
|align="left"| || align="center"|G/F || align="left"|Tennessee || align="center"|3 || align="center"|– || 120 || 3,139 || 368 || 141 || 1,801 || 26.2 || 3.1 || 1.2 || 15.0 || align=center|
|-
|align="left"| || align="center"|G || align="left"|Lanier HS (MS) || align="center"|2 || align="center"|– || 103 || 3,831 || 389 || 619 || 1,947 || 37.2 || 3.8 || 6.0 || 18.9 || align=center|
|-
|align="left"| || align="center"|F/C || align="left"|Maryland || align="center"|1 || align="center"| || 72 || 925 || 208 || 69 || 206 || 12.8 || 2.9 || 1.0 || 2.9 || align=center|
|-
|align="left"| || align="center"|C || align="left"|California || align="center"|2 || align="center"|– || 70 || 1,039 || 242 || 34 || 210 || 14.8 || 3.5 || 0.5 || 3.0 || align=center|
|-
|align="left" bgcolor="#FFFF99"|^ || align="center"|F/C || align="left"|Miami (OH) || align="center"|1 || align="center"| || 78 || 2,355 || 672 || 149 || 1,023 || 30.2 || 8.6 || 1.9 || 13.1 || align=center|
|-
|align="left"| || align="center"|C || align="left"|Wyoming || align="center"|2 || align="center"| || 6 || 51 || 17 || 3 || 7 || 8.5 || 2.8 || 0.5 || 1.2 || align=center|
|-
|align="left" bgcolor="#FFFF99"|^ || align="center"|F || align="left"|South Carolina || align="center"|2 || align="center"|– || 142 || 2,200 || 563 || 154 || 1,100 || 15.5 || 4.0 || 1.1 || 7.7 || align=center|
|-
|align="left"| || align="center"|G || align="left"|Syracuse || align="center"|2 || align="center"|– || 71 || 1,007 || 103 || 154 || 305 || 14.2 || 1.5 || 2.2 || 4.3 || align=center|
|-
|align="left"| || align="center"|G || align="left"|Kansas State || align="center"|2 || align="center"|– || 85 || 1,107 || 99 || 189 || 376 || 13.0 || 1.2 || 2.2 || 4.4 || align=center|
|-
|align="left"| || align="center"|C || align="left"|Michigan State || align="center"|2 || align="center"|– || 47 || 453 || 126 || 16 || 102 || 9.6 || 2.7 || 0.3 || 2.2 || align=center|
|-
|align="left"| || align="center"|G/F || align="left"|UCLA || align="center"|3 || align="center"|– || 133 || 1,677 || 289 || 118 || 707 || 12.6 || 2.2 || 0.9 || 5.3 || align=center|
|-
|align="left"| || align="center"|F || align="left"|Iowa State || align="center"|1 || align="center"| || 54 || 903 || 175 || 64 || 336 || 16.7 || 3.2 || 1.2 || 6.2 || align=center|
|-
|align="left"| || align="center"|G || align="left"|Michigan State || align="center"|1 || align="center"| ||  || || || || || || || ||  || align=center|
|-
|align="left"| || align="center"|G || align="left"|North Carolina || align="center"|1 || align="center"| || 70 || 1,447 || 96 || 252 || 477 || 20.7 || 1.4 || 3.6 || 6.8 || align=center|
|-
|align="left"| || align="center"|G || align="left"|Texas || align="center"|2 || align="center"| || 127 || 4,029 || 488 || 829 || 1,269 || 31.7 || 3.8 || 6.5 || 10.0 || align=center|
|-
|align="left"| || align="center"|F/C || align="left"|UTEP || align="center"|2 || align="center"| || 9 || 43 || 11 || 1 || 17 || 4.8 || 1.2 || 0.1 || 1.9 || align=center|
|-
|align="left"| || align="center"|F/C || align="left"|South Carolina || align="center"|1 || align="center"| || 70 || 918 || 235 || 42 || 272 || 13.1 || 3.4 || 0.6 || 3.9 || align=center|
|-
|align="left"| || align="center"|G || align="left"|Penn State || align="center"|1 || align="center"| || 12 || 211 || 31 || 42 || 75 || 17.6 || 2.6 || 3.5 || 6.3 || align=center|
|-
|align="left"| || align="center"|F || align="left"|Oregon State || align="center"|1 || align="center"| || 41 || 335 || 98 || 31 || 152 || 8.2 || 2.4 || 0.8 || 3.7 || align=center|
|}

G

|-
|align="left"| || align="center"|C || align="left"|UCLA || align="center"|8 || align="center"|– || 483 || 7,317 || 2,186 || 182 || 2,347 || 15.1 || 4.5 || 0.4 || 4.9 || align=center|
|-
|align="left"| || align="center"|G || align="left"|Louisville || align="center"|2 || align="center"|– || 23 || 133 || 3 || 7 || 28 || 5.8 || 0.1 || 0.3 || 1.2 || align=center|
|-
|align="left"| || align="center"|F || align="left"|Oregon State || align="center"|1 || align="center"| || 34 || 624 || 179 || 32 || 410 || 18.4 || 5.3 || 0.9 || 12.1 || align=center|
|-
|align="left"| || align="center"|G || align="left"|Southern Illinois || align="center"|1 || align="center"| || 15 || 87 || 14 || 9 || 27 || 5.8 || 0.9 || 0.6 || 1.8 || align=center|
|-
|align="left"| || align="center"|F || align="left"|Florida State || align="center"|1 || align="center"| || 33 || 383 || 72 || 20 || 155 || 11.6 || 2.2 || 0.6 || 4.7 || align=center|
|-
|align="left"| || align="center"|F/C || align="left"|Spain || align="center"|1 || align="center"| || 3 || 30 || 10 || 2 || 4 || 10.0 || 3.3 || 0.7 || 1.3 || align=center|
|-
|align="left"| || align="center"|F/C || align="left"|Old Dominion || align="center"|1 || align="center"| || 30 || 494 || 114 || 20 || 188 || 16.5 || 3.8 || 0.7 || 6.3 || align=center|
|-
|align="left"| || align="center"|G || align="left"|UConn || align="center"|1 || align="center"| || 3 || 8 || 1 || 0 || 4 || 2.7 || 0.3 || 0.0 || 1.3 || align=center|
|-
|align="left"| || align="center"|F/C || align="left"|Pacific || align="center"|2 || align="center"|– || 164 || 4,384 || 917 || 352 || 1,277 || 26.7 || 5.6 || 2.1 || 7.8 || align=center|
|-
|align="left"| || align="center"|G || align="left"|Weber State || align="center"|1 || align="center"| || 6 || 43 || 4 || 11 || 14 || 7.2 || 0.7 || 1.8 || 2.3 || align=center|
|-
|align="left"| || align="center"|G || align="left"|Illinois || align="center"|1 || align="center"| || 14 || 284 || 37 || 27 || 85 || 20.3 || 2.6 || 1.9 || 6.1 || align=center|
|-
|align="left"| || align="center"|F/C || align="left"|UNLV || align="center"|3 || align="center"|– || 196 || 4,832 || 1,062 || 176 || 1,893 || 24.7 || 5.4 || 0.9 || 9.7 || align=center|
|-
|align="left"| || align="center"|G || align="left"|Southern Illinois || align="center"|2 || align="center"|– || 42 || 607 || 59 || 40 || 250 || 14.5 || 1.4 || 1.0 || 6.0 || align=center|
|-
|align="left"| || align="center"|C || align="left"|Duke || align="center"|1 || align="center"| || 8 || 54 || 15 || 0 || 13 || 6.8 || 1.9 || 0.0 || 1.6 || align=center|
|-
|align="left"| || align="center"|G || align="left"|Houston || align="center"|1 || align="center"| || 24 || 482 || 51 || 78 || 154 || 20.1 || 2.1 || 3.3 || 6.4 || align=center|
|-
|align="left"| || align="center"|F || align="left"|Kansas || align="center"|3 || align="center"|– || 107 || 2,480 || 632 || 197 || 1,214 || 23.2 || 5.9 || 1.8 || 11.3 || align=center|
|-
|align="left"| || align="center"|C || align="left"|Wisconsin || align="center"|1 || align="center"| || 2 || 5 || 0 || 0 || 2 || 2.5 || 0.0 || 0.0 || 1.0 || align=center|
|-
|align="left"| || align="center"|G/F || align="left"|Iowa State || align="center"|4 || align="center"|– || 246 || 4,708 || 755 || 402 || 1,889 || 19.1 || 3.1 || 1.6 || 7.7 || align=center|
|-
|align="left"| || align="center"|F || align="left"|Rutgers || align="center"|2 || align="center"|– || 43 || 335 || 65 || 40 || 111 || 7.8 || 1.5 || 0.9 || 2.6 || align=center|
|-
|align="left" bgcolor="#CCFFCC"|x || align="center"|G || align="left"|Northern Iowa || align="center"|1 || align="center"| ||  || || || || || || || ||  || align=center|
|-
|align="left"| || align="center"|G || align="left"|Georgia || align="center"|1 || align="center"| || 21 || 124 || 7 || 16 || 25 || 5.9 || 0.3 || 0.8 || 1.2 || align=center|
|-
|align="left"| || align="center"|G || align="left"|Michigan || align="center"|1 || align="center"| || 30 || 501 || 46 || 105 || 163 || 16.7 || 1.5 || 3.5 || 5.4 || align=center|
|-
|align="left"| || align="center"|G || align="left"|Temple || align="center"|1 || align="center"| || 41 || 432 || 27 || 53 || 167 || 10.5 || 0.7 || 1.3 || 4.1 || align=center|
|-
|align="left"| || align="center"|F/C || align="left"|South Carolina || align="center"|1 || align="center"| || 9 || 88 || 32 || 9 || 27 || 9.8 || 3.6 || 1.0 || 3.0 || align=center|
|-
|align="left"| || align="center"|G/F || align="left"|Kentucky || align="center"|2 || align="center"|– || 142 || 2,105 || 184 || 169 || 922 || 14.8 || 1.3 || 1.2 || 6.5 || align=center|
|-
|align="left"| || align="center"|G/F || align="left"|Tennessee || align="center"|2 || align="center"|– || 155 || 3,039 || 554 || 361 || 1,345 || 19.6 || 3.6 || 2.3 || 8.7 || align=center|
|-
|align="left"| || align="center"|G || align="left"|California || align="center"|1 || align="center"| || 10 || 131 || 18 || 15 || 37 || 13.1 || 1.8 || 1.5 || 3.7 || align=center|
|}

H

|-
|align="left"| || align="center"|F || align="left"|Tennessee || align="center"|2 || align="center"|– || 70 || 704 || 106 || 13 || 254 || 10.1 || 1.5 || 0.2 || 3.6 || align=center|
|-
|align="left"| || align="center"|F || align="left"|Texas Tech || align="center"|3 || align="center"|– || 134 || 2,540 || 495 || 140 || 589 || 19.0 || 3.7 || 1.0 || 4.4 || align=center|
|-
|align="left"| || align="center"|F/C || align="left"|St. John's || align="center"|1 || align="center"| || 16 || 159 || 42 || 6 || 51 || 9.9 || 2.6 || 0.4 || 3.2 || align=center|
|-
|align="left"| || align="center"|G/F || align="left"|Kansas || align="center"|1 || align="center"| || 9 || 39 || 5 || 4 || 4 || 4.3 || 0.6 || 0.4 || 0.4 || align=center|
|-
|align="left"| || align="center"|F || align="left"|Tennessee || align="center"|2 || align="center"|– || 70 || 804 || 158 || 35 || 344 || 11.5 || 2.3 || 0.5 || 4.9 || align=center|
|-
|align="left"| || align="center"|G || align="left"|Syracuse || align="center"|1 || align="center"| || 1 || 10 || 0 || 1 || 2 || 10.0 || 0.0 || 1.0 || 2.0 || align=center|
|-
|align="left"| || align="center"|F/C || align="left"|Washington || align="center"|1 || align="center"| || 19 || 171 || 45 || 19 || 83 || 9.0 || 2.4 || 1.0 || 4.4 || align=center|
|-
|align="left"| || align="center"|F || align="left"|Georgia || align="center"|1 || align="center"| || 2 || 6 || 5 || 0 || 6 || 3.0 || 2.5 || 0.0 || 3.0 || align=center|
|-
|align="left"| || align="center"|G || align="left"|VCU || align="center"|1 || align="center"| || 11 || 129 || 12 || 13 || 27 || 11.7 || 1.1 || 1.2 || 2.5 || align=center|
|-
|align="left"| || align="center"|F/C || align="left"|New Mexico || align="center"|1 || align="center"| || 6 || 36 || 7 || 0 || 12 || 6.0 || 1.2 || 0.0 || 2.0 || align=center|
|-
|align="left"| || align="center"|G || align="left"|UC Santa Barbara || align="center"|1 || align="center"| || 14 || 145 || 19 || 29 || 32 || 10.4 || 1.4 || 2.1 || 2.3 || align=center|
|-
|align="left"| || align="center"|F/C || align="left"|North Carolina || align="center"|7 || align="center"|– || 405 || 8,152 || 2,206 || 442 || 3,162 || 20.1 || 5.4 || 1.1 || 7.8 || align=center|
|-
|align="left"| || align="center"|G || align="left"|Kansas State || align="center"|2 || align="center"|– || 118 || 1,076 || 92 || 213 || 364 || 9.1 || 0.8 || 1.8 || 3.1 || align=center|
|-
|align="left"| || align="center"|F/C || align="left"|Davidson || align="center"|1 || align="center"| || 53 || 1,591 || 473 || 83 || 843 || 30.0 || 8.9 || 1.6 || 15.9 || align=center|
|-
|align="left" | || align="center"|G || align="left"|IUPUI || align="center"|1 || align="center"|– || 47 || 958 || 121 || 99 || 318 || 20.4 || 2.6 || 2.1 || 6.8 || align=center|
|-
|align="left"| || align="center"|F || align="left"|Xavier || align="center"|2 || align="center"|– || 74 || 2,581 || 742 || 105 || 717 || 34.9 || 10.0 || 1.4 || 9.7 || align=center|
|-
|align="left"| || align="center"|G || align="left"|New Mexico || align="center"|1 || align="center"| || 5 || 39 || 3 || 6 || 4 || 7.8 || 0.6 || 1.2 || 0.8 || align=center|
|-
|align="left"| || align="center"|G || align="left"|NC State || align="center"|1 || align="center"| || 5 || 28 || 5 || 2 || 9 || 5.6 || 1.0 || 0.4 || 1.8 || align=center|
|-
|align="left"| || align="center"|G || align="left"|Long Beach State || align="center"|4 || align="center"|– || 269 || 7,365 || 489 || 927 || 2,830 || 27.4 || 1.8 || 3.4 || 10.5 || align=center|
|-
|align="left" bgcolor="#CCFFCC"|x || align="center"|G || align="left"|UCLA || align="center"|1 || align="center"| ||  || || || || || || || ||  || align=center|
|-
|align="left"| || align="center"|G || align="left"|UCLA || align="center"|1 || align="center"| || 1 || 9 || 0 || 2 || 0 || 9.0 || 0.0 || 2.0 || 0.0 || align=center|
|-
|align="left"| || align="center"|G/F || align="left"|Tulane || align="center"|2 || align="center"|– || 41 || 542 || 94 || 33 || 250 || 13.2 || 2.3 || 0.8 || 6.1 || align=center|
|-
|align="left" | || align="center"|G || align="left"|Duke || align="center"|1 || align="center"| ||  || || || || || || || ||  || align=center|
|-
|align="left"| || align="center"|F/C || align="left"|Nebraska || align="center"|1 || align="center"| || 3 || 35 || 7 || 2 || 11 || 11.7 || 2.3 || 0.7 || 3.7 || align=center|
|-
|align="left"| || align="center"|C || align="left"|Miami (FL) || align="center"|2 || align="center"|– || 60 || 348 || 81 || 5 || 93 || 5.8 || 1.4 || 0.1 || 1.6 || align=center|
|-
|align="left"| || align="center"|G || align="left"|Arizona State || align="center"|1 || align="center"| || 5 || 41 || 3 || 5 || 16 || 8.2 || 0.6 || 1.0 || 3.2 || align=center|
|-
|align="left"| || align="center"|F || align="left"|Austin Peay || align="center"|1 || align="center"| || 3 || 22 || 7 || 1 || 10 || 7.3 || 2.3 || 0.3 || 3.3 || align=center|
|-
|align="left"| || align="center"|C || align="left"|Wisconsin || align="center"|1 ||  align="center"| || 45 || 331 || 77 || 24 || 32 || 7.4 || 1.7 || 0.5 || 0.7 || align=center|
|-
|align="left"| || align="center"|G || align="left"|Colorado || align="center"|5 || align="center"|– || 323 || 10,277 || 885 || 1,922 || 4,336 || 31.8 || 2.7 || 6.0 || 13.4 || align=center|
|-
|align="left"| || align="center"|G || align="left"|Jackson State || align="center"|1 || align="center"| || 82 || 2,002 || 169 || 222 || 825 || 24.4 || 2.1 || 2.7 || 10.1 || align=center|
|}

I

|-
|align="left" | || align="center"|F/C || align="left"|Republic of the Congo || align="center"|1 || align="center"|– ||  || || || || || || || ||  || align=center|
|-
|align="left"| || align="center"|F || align="left"|Turkey || align="center"|8 || align="center"|–– || 520 || 12,071 || 3,041 || 557 || 5,297 || 23.2 || 5.8 || 1.1 || 10.2 || align=center|
|-
|align="left" bgcolor="#CCFFCC"|x || align="center"|F || align="left"|Australia || align="center"|1 || align="center"| ||  || || || || || || || ||  || align=center|
|-
|align="left"| || align="center"|F || align="left"|France || align="center"|1 || align="center"| || 20 || 156 || 31 || 10 || 36 || 7.8 || 1.6 || 0.5 || 1.8 || align=center|
|-
|align="left"| || align="center"|G || align="left"|Texas || align="center"|2 || align="center"| || 93 || 1,527 || 126 || 170 || 441 || 16.4 || 1.4 || 1.8 || 4.7 || align=center|
|}

J

|-
|align="left"| || align="center"|F || align="left"|Kansas || align="center"|1 || align="center"| || 1 || 9 || 2 || 0 || 2 || 9.0 || 2.0 || 0.0 || 2.0 || align=center|
|-
|align="left"| || align="center"|G || align="left"|Detroit Mercy || align="center"|1 || align="center"| || 30 || 202 || 27 || 25 || 35 || 6.7 || 0.9 || 0.8 || 1.2 || align=center|
|-
|align="left"| || align="center"|F || align="left"|North Carolina || align="center"|1 || align="center"| ||  || || || || || || || ||  || align=center|
|-
|align="left"| || align="center"|G/F || align="left"|Butler CC || align="center"|1 || align="center"| || 26 || 712 || 82 || 77 || 274 || 27.4 || 3.2 || 3.0 || 10.5 || align=center|
|-
|align="left"| || align="center"|G || align="left"|Duquesne || align="center"|1 || align="center"| || 47 || 1,167 || 122 || 185 || 535 || 24.8 || 2.6 || 3.9 || 11.4 || align=center|
|-
|align="left"| || align="center"|F || align="left"|Arizona || align="center"|1 || align="center"| || 82 || 2,939 || 374 || 199 || 1,607 || 35.8 || 4.6 || 2.4 || 19.6 || align=center|
|-
|align="left"| || align="center"|G || align="left"|Oak Hill Academy (VA) || align="center"|5 || align="center"|– || 305 || 10,273 || 1,019 || 1,705 || 5,019 || 33.7 || 3.3 || 5.6 || 16.5 || align=center|
|-
|align="left"| || align="center"|C || align="left"|New Orleans || align="center"|7 || align="center"|– || 461 || 10,309 || 3,050 || 215 || 1,929 || 22.4 || 6.6 || 0.5 || 4.2 || align=center|
|-
|align="left"| || align="center"|F/C || align="left"|St. John's || align="center"|1 || align="center"| || 67 || 1,157 || 360 || 81 || 414 || 17.3 || 5.4 || 1.2 || 6.2 || align=center|
|-
|align="left" bgcolor="#FFCC00"|+ (#8) || align="center"|G/F || align="left"|UCLA || align="center"|7 || align="center"|– || 524 || 18,240 || 3,923 || 1,934 || 10,980 || 34.8 || 7.5 || 3.7 || 21.0 || align=center|
|-
|align="left"| || align="center"|F || align="left"|Aurora || align="center"|3 || align="center"|– || 164 || 4,205 || 1,024 || 512 || 2,068 || 25.6 || 6.2 || 3.1 || 12.6 || align=center|
|-
|align="left"| || align="center"|G || align="left"|Houston || align="center"|2 || align="center"| || 100 || 2,124 || 176 || 485 || 606 || 21.2 || 1.8 || 4.9 || 6.1 || align=center|
|-
|align="left"| || align="center"|C || align="left"|District of Columbia || align="center"|1 || align="center"| || 12 || 43 || 10 || 4 || 13 || 3.6 || 0.8 || 0.3 || 1.1 || align=center|
|-
|align="left"| || align="center"|F || align="left"|Kentucky || align="center"|1 || align="center"| || 3 || 6 || 3 || 0 || 0 || 2.0 || 1.0 || 0.0 || 0.0 || align=center|
|-
|align="left"| || align="center"|G || align="left"|Villanova || align="center"|2 || align="center"|– || 75 || 1,449 || 104 || 197 || 496 || 19.3 || 1.4 || 2.6 || 6.6 || align=center|
|-
|align="left"| || align="center"|G || align="left"|Kansas || align="center"|1 || align="center"| || 4 || 18 || 0 || 3 || 6 || 4.5 || 0.0 || 0.8 || 1.5 || align=center|
|}

K

|-
|align="left" | || align="center"|F || align="left"|Greece || align="center"|1 || align="center"| || 9 || 48 || || || || || || ||  || align=center|
|-
|align="left"| || align="center"|F || align="left"|Longwood || align="center"|1 || align="center"| || 22 || 243 || 45 || 15 || 72 || 11.0 || 2.0 || 0.7 || 3.3 || align=center|
|-
|align="left"| || align="center"|G/F || align="left"|Southern Miss || align="center"|1 || align="center"| || 69 || 816 || 125 || 65 || 232 || 11.8 || 1.8 || 0.9 || 3.4 || align=center|
|-
|align="left"| || align="center"|G || align="left"|Cincinnati || align="center"|1 || align="center"| || 23 || 205 || 25 || 15 || 93 || 8.9 || 1.1 || 0.7 || 4.0 || align=center|
|-
|align="left"| || align="center"|F/C || align="left"|UConn || align="center"|1 || align="center"| || 74 || 971 || 312 || 60 || 258 || 13.1 || 4.2 || 0.8 || 3.5 || align=center|
|-
|align="left"| || align="center"|G || align="left"|Kentucky || align="center"|2 || align="center"|– || 124 || 4,088 || 476 || 633 || 2,214 || 33.0 || 3.8 || 5.1 || 17.9 || align=center|
|-
|align="left"| || align="center"|G || align="left"|Stanford || align="center"|1 || align="center"| || 21 || 420 || 48 || 98 || 123 || 20.0 || 2.3 || 4.7 || 5.9 || align=center|
|-
|align="left"| || align="center"|F || align="left"|Vanderbilt || align="center"|2 || align="center"|– || 89 || 595 || 95 || 30 || 171 || 6.7 || 1.1 || 0.3 || 1.9 || align=center|
|-
|align="left"| || align="center"|G || align="left"|Creighton || align="center"|1 || align="center"| ||  || || || || || || || ||  || align=center|
|-
|align="left"| || align="center"|F/C || align="left"|Montana || align="center"|4 || align="center"|– || 225 || 5,751 || 1,346 || 296 || 2,202 || 25.6 || 6.0 || 1.3 || 9.8 || align=center|
|-
|align="left"| || align="center"|F/C || align="left"|Bradley || align="center"|1 || align="center"| || 59 || 517 || 123 || 35 || 168 || 8.8 || 2.1 || 0.6 || 2.8 || align=center|
|-
|align="left"| || align="center"|F || align="left"|Croatia || align="center"|4 || align="center"|– || 254 || 5,343 || 847 || 729 || 1,959 || 21.0 || 3.3 || 2.9 || 7.7 || align=center|
|}

L

|-
|align="left"| || align="center"|G || align="left"|Kentucky || align="center"|1 || align="center"| || 23 || 280 || 17 || 20 || 78 || 12.2 || 0.7 || 0.9 || 3.4 || align=center|
|-
|align="left"| || align="center"|G/F || align="left"|Virginia || align="center"|1 || align="center"| || 44 || 701 || 121 || 64 || 276 || 15.9 || 2.8 || 1.5 || 6.3 || align=center|
|-
|align="left"| || align="center"|F || align="left"|Pittsburgh || align="center"|1 || align="center"| || 2 || 6 || 4 || 0 || 3 || 3.0 || 2.0 || 0.0 || 1.5 || align=center|
|-
|align="left"| || align="center"|C || align="left"|Arkansas || align="center"|2 || align="center"|– || 109 || 1,886 || 431 || 41 || 426 || 17.3 || 4.0 || 0.4 || 3.9 || align=center|
|-
|align="left"| || align="center"|F || align="left"|Vanderbilt || align="center"|1 || align="center"| || 2 || 20 || 1 || 0 || 7 || 10.0 || 0.5 || 0.0 || 3.5 || align=center|
|-
|align="left" bgcolor="#FFFF99"|^ (#16) || align="center"|C || align="left"|St. Bonaventure || align="center"|5 || align="center"|– || 278 || 7,463 || 1,635 || 751 || 3,760 || 26.8 || 5.9 || 2.7 || 13.5 || align=center|
|-
|align="left"| || align="center"|G || align="left"|Hofstra || align="center"|1 || align="center"| || 10 || 57 || 10 || 3 || 24 || 5.7 || 1.0 || 0.3 || 2.4 || align=center|
|-
|align="left"| || align="center"|G/F || align="left"|Marshall || align="center"|2 || align="center"|– || 82 || 443 || 83 || 58 || 217 || 5.4 || 1.0 || 0.7 || 2.6 || align=center|
|-
|align="left" bgcolor="#CCFFCC"|x || align="center"|C || align="left"|Illinois || align="center"|1 || align="center"| ||  || || || || || || || ||  || align=center|
|-
|align="left"| || align="center"|F || align="left"|Wisconsin || align="center"|1 || align="center"| || 46 || 555 || 120 || 25 || 218 || 12.1 || 2.6 || 0.5 || 4.7 || align=center|
|-
|align="left"| || align="center"|G || align="left"|Kentucky || align="center"|1 || align="center"| || 31 || 480 || 49 || 27 || 57 || 15.5 || 1.6 || 0.9 || 1.8 || align=center|
|-
|align="left"| || align="center"|F/C || align="left"|Arizona State || align="center"|7 || align="center"|–– || 471 || 9,793 || 3,062 || 549 || 3,433 || 20.8 || 6.5 || 1.2 || 7.3 || align=center|
|-
|align="left"| || align="center"|G || align="left"|Peoria HS (IL) || align="center"|1 || align="center"| || 58 || 1,092 || 123 || 122 || 318 || 18.8 || 2.1 || 2.1 || 5.5 || align=center|
|-
|align="left"| || align="center"|F/C || align="left"|Arizona State || align="center"|2 || align="center"|– || 83 || 1,137 || 236 || 42 || 431 || 13.7 || 2.8 || 0.5 || 5.2 || align=center|
|-
|align="left"| || align="center"|F/C || align="left"|Iowa || align="center"|5 || align="center"|– || 350 || 6,381 || 1,180 || 444 || 2,352 || 18.2 || 3.4 || 1.3 || 6.7 || align=center|
|-
|align="left" bgcolor="#CCFFCC"|x || align="center"|C || align="left"|Stanford || align="center"|1 || align="center"| || 81 || 2,322 || 396 || 98 || 1,009 || 28.7 || 4.9 || 1.2 || 12.5 || align=center|
|-
|align="left"| || align="center"|C || align="left"|Stanford || align="center"|1 || align="center"| ||  || || || || || || || ||  || align=center|
|-
|align="left"| || align="center"|F || align="left"|Southern || align="center"|1 || align="center"| || 14 || 227 || 64 || 3 || 107 || 16.2 || 4.6 || 0.2 || 7.6 || align=center|
|-
|align="left"| || align="center"|G || align="left"|Puget Sound || align="center"|1 || align="center"| || 20 || 134 || 19 || 14 || 45 || 6.7 || 1.0 || 0.7 || 2.3 || align=center|
|-
|align="left"| || align="center"|G || align="left"|Maryland || align="center"|2 || align="center"|– || 124 || 3,124 || 284 || 682 || 1,496 || 25.2 || 2.3 || 5.5 || 12.1 || align=center|
|-
|align="left"| || align="center"|G || align="left"|Nebraska || align="center"|1 || align="center"| || 30 || 392 || 35 || 46 || 141 || 13.1 || 1.2 || 1.5 || 4.7 || align=center|
|}

M

|-
|align="left"| || align="center"|F || align="left"|Duke || align="center"|1 || align="center"| || 67 || 1,401 || 241 || 84 || 805 || 20.9 || 3.6 || 1.3 || 12.0 || align=center|
|-
|align="left"| || align="center"|C || align="left"|Kentucky || align="center"|1 || align="center"| || 82 || 2,465 || 778 || 56 || 752 || 30.1 || 9.5 || 0.7 || 9.2 || align=center|
|-
|align="left"| || align="center"|F/C || align="left"|South Sudan || align="center"|3 || align="center"|– || 166 || 2,209 || 435 || 87 || 746 || 13.3 || 2.6 || 0.5 || 4.5 || align=center|
|-
|align="left" bgcolor="#FFFF99"|^ || align="center"|F/C || align="left"|Petersburg HS (VA) || align="center"|2 || align="center"|– || 93 || 2,615 || 790 || 100 || 1,329 || 28.1 || 8.5 || 1.1 || 14.3 || align=center|
|-
|align="left" bgcolor="#CCFFCC"|x || align="center"|C || align="left"|Seton Hall || align="center"|1 || align="center"| ||  || || || || || || || ||  || align=center|
|-
|align="left"| || align="center"|F/C || align="left"|Kansas || align="center"|1 || align="center"| || 72 || 1,217 || 208 || 73 || 333 || 16.9 || 2.9 || 1.0 || 4.6 || align=center|
|-
|align="left"| || align="center"|G || align="left"|Utah || align="center"|1 || align="center"| || 35 || 477 || 51 || 55 || 123 || 13.6 || 1.5 || 1.6 || 3.5 || align=center|
|-
|align="left"| || align="center"|C || align="left"|Croatia || align="center"|1 || align="center"| || 30 || 170 || 31 || 6 || 51 || 5.7 || 1.0 || 0.2 || 1.7 || align=center|
|-
|align="left"| || align="center"|G || align="left"|North Carolina || align="center"|1 || align="center"| || 28 || 417 || 28 || 86 || 118 || 14.9 || 1.0 || 3.1 || 4.2 || align=center|
|-
|align="left"| || align="center"|G/F || align="left"|Purdue || align="center"|1 || align="center"| || 3 || 13 || 1 || 1 || 0 || 4.3 || 0.3 || 0.3 || 0.0 || align=center|
|-
|align="left"| || align="center"|F || align="left"|Cincinnati || align="center"|1 || align="center"| || 11 || 104 || 19 || 5 || 20 || 9.5 || 1.7 || 0.5 || 1.8 || align=center|
|-
|align="left"| || align="center"|F || align="left"|Tennessee State || align="center"|2 || align="center"|– || 147 || 5,262 || 1,062 || 555 || 1,253 || 35.8 || 7.2 || 3.8 || 8.5 || align=center|
|-
|align="left"| || align="center"|F || align="left"|Oklahoma State || align="center"|4 || align="center"|– || 249 || 8,081 || 1,115 || 558 || 3,549 || 32.5 || 4.5 || 2.2 || 14.3 || align=center|
|-
|align="left"| || align="center"|G || align="left"|Kansas || align="center"|1 || align="center"| ||  || || || || || || || ||  || align=center|
|-
|align="left"| || align="center"|G || align="left"|Marquette || align="center"|1 || align="center"| ||  || || || || || || || ||  || align=center|
|-
|align="left"| || align="center"|F || align="left"|Indiana || align="center"|1 || align="center"| || 65 || 1,187 || 218 || 133 || 583 || 18.3 || 3.4 || 2.0 || 9.0 || align=center|
|-
|align="left"| || align="center"|G || align="left"|Arkansas || align="center"|4 || align="center"|– || 328 || 6,424 || 391 || 1,066 || 1,753 || 19.6 || 1.2 || 3.3 || 5.3 || align=center|
|-
|align="left"| || align="center"|F || align="left"|Furman || align="center"|1 || align="center"| || 65 || 948 || 263 || 37 || 284 || 14.6 || 4.0 || 0.6 || 4.4 || align=center|
|-
|align="left"| || align="center"|G || align="left"|USC || align="center"|3 || align="center"|– || 164 || 4,133 || 416 || 428 || 1,735 || 25.2 || 2.5 || 2.6 || 10.6 || align=center|
|-
|align="left"| || align="center"|F || align="left"|UCLA || align="center"|5 || align="center"|– || 335 || 8,408 || 1,790 || 320 || 2,296 || 25.1 || 5.3 || 1.0 || 6.9 || align=center|
|-
|align="left"| || align="center"|G || align="left"|Maryland || align="center"|1 || align="center"| || 5 || 12 || 0 || 0 || 0 || 2.4 || 0.0 || 0.0 || 0.0 || align=center|
|-
|align="left"| || align="center"|G/F || align="left"|Long Beach State || align="center"|1 || align="center"| || 9 || 79 || 12 || 7 || 19 || 8.8 || 1.3 || 0.8 || 2.1 || align=center|
|-
|align="left"| || align="center"|F/C || align="left"|Memphis || align="center"|1 || align="center"| || 7 || 70 || 19 || 2 || 22 || 10.0 || 2.7 || 0.3 || 3.1 || align=center|
|-
|align="left" bgcolor="#FFCC00"|+ (#14) || align="center"|G/F || align="left"|Indiana || align="center"|8 || align="center"|– || 595 || 17,008 || 1,432 || 1,921 || 7,505 || 28.6 || 2.4 || 3.2 || 12.6 || align=center|
|-
|align="left"| || align="center"|F/C || align="left"|Drake || align="center"|2 || align="center"|– || 38 || 514 || 139 || 42 || 161 || 13.5 || 3.7 || 1.1 || 4.2 || align=center|
|-
|align="left"| || align="center"|G || align="left"|Kentucky || align="center"|1 || align="center"| || 41 || 486 || 72 || 22 || 169 || 11.9 || 1.8 || 0.5 || 4.1 || align=center|
|-
|align="left"| || align="center"|G || align="left"|Utah State || align="center"|1 || align="center"| ||  || || || || || || || ||  || align=center|
|-
|align="left"| || align="center"|F/C || align="left"|UCLA || align="center"|4 || align="center"|– || 281 || 7,471 || 1,771 || 652 || 3,149 || 26.6 || 6.3 || 2.3 || 11.2 || align=center|
|-
|align="left"| || align="center"|F || align="left"|Houston || align="center"|1 || align="center"| || 18 || 171 || 44 || 13 || 46 || 9.5 || 2.4 || 0.7 || 2.6 || align=center|
|-
|align="left" bgcolor="#FBCEB1"|* || align="center"|G/F || align="left"|Texas A&M || align="center"|6 || align="center"|– || 428 || 13,954 || 1,972 || 1,440 || 6,964 || 32.6 || 4.6 || 3.4 || 16.3 || align=center|
|-
|align="left"| || align="center"|F || align="left"|Notre Dame || align="center"|1 || align="center"| || 3 || 27 || 2 || 0 || 9 || 9.0 || 0.7 || 0.0 || 3.0 || align=center|
|-
|align="left"| || align="center"|F || align="left"|Montenegro || align="center"|1 || align="center"| || 14 || 320 || 75 || 20 || 163 || 22.9 || 5.4 || 1.4 || 11.6 || align=center|
|-
|align="left"| || align="center"|F || align="left"|Alabama || align="center"|1 || align="center"| || 3 || 10 || 1 || 1 || 6 || 3.3 || 0.3 || 0.3 || 2.0 || align=center|
|-
|align="left"| || align="center"|F || align="left"|Toledo || align="center"|1 || align="center"| || 57 || 792 || 136 || 68 || 341 || 13.9 || 2.4 || 1.2 || 6.0 || align=center|
|-
|align="left"| || align="center"|C || align="left"|Pittsburgh || align="center"|2 || align="center"|– || 51 || 652 || 165 || 21 || 186 || 12.8 || 3.2 || 0.4 || 3.6 || align=center|
|-
|align="left"| || align="center"|F/C || align="left"|Kansas || align="center"|7 || align="center"|– || 438 || 5,698 || 1,383 || 276 || 1,617 || 13.0 || 3.2 || 0.6 || 3.7 || align=center|
|-
|align="left" bgcolor="#FFFF99"|^ (#4) || align="center"|G || align="left"|Arkansas || align="center"|10 || align="center"|– || 695 || 22,054 || 3,447 || 2,689 || 11,594 || 31.7 || 5.0 || 3.9 || 16.7 || align=center|
|-
|align="left"| || align="center"|F/C || align="left"|Georgetown || align="center"|3 || align="center"|– || 165 || 4,216 || 1,253 || 370 || 2,195 || 25.6 || 7.6 || 2.2 || 13.3 || align=center|
|-
|align="left"| || align="center"|F || align="left"|Loyola (IL) || align="center"|1 || align="center"| || 3 || 16 || 2 || 1 || 4 || 5.3 || 0.7 || 0.3 || 1.3 || align=center|
|-
|align="left"| || align="center"|G || align="left"|Molloy || align="center"|1 || align="center"| || 4 || 29 || 5 || 4 || 10 || 7.3 || 1.3 || 1.0 || 2.5 || align=center|
|-
|align="left"| || align="center"|G/F || align="left"|UCLA || align="center"|1 || align="center"| || 11 || 117 || 31 || 7 || 94 || 10.6 || 2.8 || 0.6 || 8.5 || align=center|
|-
|align="left"| || align="center"|G || align="left"|Rhode Island || align="center"|1 || align="center"| || 6 || 21 || 1 || 4 || 3 || 3.5 || 0.2 || 0.7 || 0.5 || align=center|
|-
|align="left"| || align="center"|G || align="left"|Providence || align="center"|4 || align="center"|– || 245 || 7,321 || 773 || 1,666 || 3,434 || 29.9 || 3.2 || 6.8 || 14.0 || align=center|
|-
|align="left"| || align="center"|G || align="left"|Shaw || align="center"|1 || align="center"| || 12 || 42 || 1 || 3 || 23 || 3.5 || 0.1 || 0.3 || 1.9 || align=center|
|}

N to O

|-
|align="left"| || align="center"|C || align="left"|UCLA || align="center"|1 || align="center"| || 72 || 1,960 || 865 || 108 || 938 || 27.2 || 12.0 || 1.5 || 13.0 || align=center|
|-
|align="left"| || align="center"|G || align="left"|Towson || align="center"|1 || align="center"| || 30 || 607 || 50 || 46 || 301 || 20.2 || 1.7 || 1.5 || 10.0 || align=center|
|-
|align="left"| || align="center"|C || align="left"|Duquesne || align="center"|1 || align="center"| || 28 || 102 || 20 || 7 || 35 || 3.6 || 0.7 || 0.3 || 1.3 || align=center|
|-
|align="left"| || align="center"|G/F || align="left"|Richmond || align="center"|3 || align="center"|– || 246 || 6,646 || 559 || 361 || 2,238 || 27.0 || 2.3 || 1.5 || 9.1 || align=center|
|-
|align="left"| || align="center"|C || align="left"|Saint Louis || align="center"|1 || align="center"| || 18 || 149 || 59 || 7 || 59 || 8.3 || 3.3 || 0.4 || 3.3 || align=center|
|-
|align="left"| || align="center"|F || align="left"|North Carolina || align="center"|1 || align="center"| || 68 || 792 || 123 || 65 || 184 || 11.6 || 1.8 || 1.0 || 2.7 || align=center|
|-
|align="left"| || align="center"|F || align="left"|Green Bay || align="center"|1 || align="center"| || 13 || 48 || 14 || 3 || 18 || 3.7 || 1.1 || 0.2 || 1.4 || align=center|
|-
|align="left"| || align="center"|F || align="left"|Illinois || align="center"|1 || align="center"| || 82 || 2,539 || 500 || 222 || 979 || 31.0 || 6.1 || 2.7 || 11.9 || align=center|
|-
|align="left" ||| align="center"|F || align="left"|Louisville || align="center"|1 || align="center"|– ||  || || || || || || || ||  || align=center|
|-
|align="left"| || align="center"|F || align="left"|Marquette || align="center"|2 || align="center"|– || 11 || 42 || 4 || 0 || 12 || 3.8 || 0.4 || 0.0 || 1.1 || align=center|
|-
|align="left"| || align="center"|F/C || align="left"|LSU || align="center"|2 || align="center"|– || 100 || 1,225 || 240 || 49 || 300 || 12.3 || 2.4 || 0.5 || 3.0 || align=center|
|-
|align="left"| || align="center"|C || align="left"|UAB || align="center"|1 || align="center"| || 3 || 26 || 6 || 4 || 8 || 8.7 || 2.0 || 1.3 || 2.7 || align=center|
|-
|align="left" | || align="center"|F || align="left"|SMU || align="center"|1 || align="center"| ||  || || || || || || || ||  || align=center|
|-
|align="left"| || align="center"|G || align="left"|UConn || align="center"|1 || align="center"| || 53 || 1,127 || 99 || 181 || 303 || 21.3 || 1.9 || 3.4 || 5.7 || align=center|
|-
|align="left"| || align="center"|C || align="left"|Fordham || align="center"|1 || align="center"| || 3 || 7 || 2 || 1 || 5 || 2.3 || 0.7 || 0.3 || 1.7 || align=center|
|}

P

|-
|align="left"| || align="center"|C || align="left"|Georgia || align="center"|3 || align="center"|– || 200 || 4,452 || 1,211 || 374 || 1,472 || 22.3 || 6.1 || 1.9 || 7.4 || align=center|
|-
|align="left"| || align="center"|F || align="left"|Duke || align="center"|4 || align="center"|– || 183 || 5,617 || 998 || 373 || 2,794 || 30.7 || 5.5 || 2.0 || 15.3 || align=center|
|-
|align="left"| || align="center"|F || align="left"|Cincinnati || align="center"|1 || align="center"| || 81 || 2,508 || 440 || 232 || 1,194 || 31.0 || 5.4 || 2.9 || 14.7 || align=center|
|-
|align="left"| || align="center"|F/C || align="left"|Northeastern State || align="center"|1 || align="center"| || 17 || 217 || 78 || 3 || 51 || 12.8 || 4.6 || 0.2 || 3.0 || align=center|
|-
|align="left" bgcolor="#FFFF99"|^ || align="center"|G || align="left"|Oregon State || align="center"|1 || align="center"| || 28 || 1,085 || 86 || 206 || 550 || 38.8 || 3.1 || 7.4 || 19.6 || align=center|
|-
|align="left"| || align="center"|G || align="left"|Oregon State || align="center"|2 || align="center"|– || 18 || 205 || 29 || 22 || 50 || 11.4 || 1.6 || 1.2 || 2.8 || align=center|
|-
|align="left"| || align="center"|C || align="left"|Michigan State || align="center"|1 || align="center"| || 5 || 12 || 4 || 1 || 7 || 2.4 || 0.8 || 0.2 || 1.4 || align=center|
|-
|align="left"| || align="center"|F || align="left"|Missouri State || align="center"|3 || align="center"|– || 198 || 5,951 || 1,818 || 384 || 1,691 || 30.1 || 9.2 || 1.9 || 8.5 || align=center|
|-
|align="left"| || align="center"|G || align="left"|Memphis || align="center"|3 || align="center"|– || 168 || 3,394 || 240 || 489 || 1,173 || 20.2 || 1.4 || 2.9 || 7.0 || align=center|
|-
|align="left" bgcolor="#FFCC00"|+ || align="center"|G || align="left"|Rice || align="center"|8 || align="center"|– || 460 || 12,055 || 1,223 || 907 || 7,570 || 26.2 || 2.7 || 2.0 || 16.5 || align=center|
|-
|align="left"| || align="center"|F || align="left"|Villanova || align="center"|1 || align="center"| || 62 || 835 || 211 || 21 || 140 || 13.5 || 3.4 || 0.3 || 2.3 || align=center|
|-
|align="left"| || align="center"|C || align="left"|Duke || align="center"|1 || align="center"| || 8 || 52 || 17 || 2 || 14 || 6.5 || 2.1 || 0.3 || 1.8 || align=center|
|-
|align="left"| || align="center"|F/C || align="left"|Duke || align="center"|3 || align="center"|– || 112 || 1,369 || 331 || 41 || 457 || 12.2 || 3.0 || 0.4 || 4.1 || align=center|
|-
|align="left"| || align="center"|F || align="left"|Kentucky || align="center"|2 || align="center"|– || 108 || 1,368 || 220 || 55 || 238 || 12.7 || 2.0 || 0.5 || 2.2 || align=center|
|-
|align="left"| || align="center"|F/C || align="left"|North Carolina || align="center"|1 || align="center"| || 5 || 26 || 5 || 3 || 7 || 5.2 || 1.0 || 0.6 || 1.4 || align=center|
|-
|align="left" bgcolor="#CCFFCC"|x || align="center"|C || align="left"|Arkansas || align="center"|1 || align="center"| ||  || || || || || || || ||  || align=center|
|-
|align="left"| || align="center"|G/F || align="left"|Tulsa || align="center"|8 || align="center"|– || 580 || 16,949 || 2,496 || bgcolor="#CFECEC"|3,272 || 6,906 || 29.2 || 4.3 || 5.6 || 11.9 || align=center|
|-
|align="left" bgcolor="#FFCC00"|+ || align="center"|G || align="left"|Louisville || align="center"|3 || align="center"|– || 127 || 4,167 || 429 || 633 || 1,598 || 32.8 || 3.4 || 5.0 || 12.6 || align=center|
|-
|align="left"| || align="center"|C || align="left"|Minnesota || align="center"|5 || align="center"|– || 153 || 2,045 || 530 || 42 || 268 || 13.4 || 3.5 || 0.3 || 1.8 || align=center|
|-
|align="left"| || align="center"|F || align="left"|McNeese State || align="center"|1 || align="center"| || 8 || 37 || 8 || 2 || 17 || 4.6 || 1.0 || 0.3 || 2.1 || align=center|
|}

R

|-
|align="left"| || align="center"|C || align="left"|Serbia || align="center"|1 || align="center"| || 48 || 465 || 108 || 23 || 181 || 9.7 || 2.3 || 0.5 || 3.8 || align=center|
|-
|align="left" bgcolor="#FFCC00"|+ || align="center"|G || align="left"|Ohio State || align="center" bgcolor="#CFECEC"|11 || align="center"|– || 578 || 19,334 || 2,334 || 1,305 || 11,554 || 33.4 || 4.0 || 2.3 || 20.0 || align=center|
|-
|align="left"| || align="center"|G || align="left"|Duke || align="center"|1 || align="center"| || 28 || 804 || 52 || 76 || 344 || 28.7 || 1.9 || 2.7 || 12.3 || align=center|
|-
|align="left"| || align="center"|F || align="left"|North Carolina || align="center"|1 || align="center"| || 34 || 602 || 117 || 18 || 150 || 17.7 || 3.4 || 0.5 || 4.4 || align=center|
|-
|align="left"| || align="center"|C || align="left"|Iowa || align="center"|1 || align="center"| || 27 || 244 || 71 || 13 || 33 || 9.0 || 2.6 || 0.5 || 1.2 || align=center|
|-
|align="left"| || align="center"|G || align="left"|Michigan State || align="center"|2 || align="center"|– || 76 || 928 || 81 || 76 || 323 || 12.2 || 1.1 || 1.0 || 4.3 || align=center|
|-
|align="left"| || align="center"|F/C || align="left"|San Francisco || align="center"|5 || align="center"|– || 311 || 6,203 || 1,440 || 434 || 1,862 || 19.9 || 4.6 || 1.4 || 6.0 || align=center|
|-
|align="left"| || align="center"|G/F || align="left"|LSU || align="center"|4 || align="center"|– || 194 || 2,823 || 446 || 308 || 1,161 || 14.6 || 2.3 || 1.6 || 6.0 || align=center|
|-
|align="left"| || align="center"|G || align="left"|Oregon || align="center"|3 || align="center"|– || 190 || 4,555 || 423 || 811 || 1,746 || 24.0 || 2.2 || 4.3 || 9.2 || align=center|
|-
|align="left"| || align="center"|F/C || align="left"|BYU || align="center"|5 || align="center"|– || 394 || 8,834 || 1,295 || 588 || 3,530 || 22.4 || 3.3 || 1.5 || 9.0 || align=center|
|-
|align="left" bgcolor="#FFCC00"|+ || align="center"|G || align="left"|Arkansas || align="center"|4 || align="center"|– || 283 || 8,725 || 1,505 || 1,405 || 3,600 || 30.8 || 5.3 || 5.0 || 12.7 || align=center|
|-
|align="left" bgcolor="#FFFF99"|^ (#1) || align="center"|G/F || align="left"|Cincinnati || align="center"|4 || align="center"|– || 288 || 10,798 || 1,424 || 2,156 || 4,701 || 37.5 || 4.9 || 7.5 || 16.3 || align=center|
|-
|align="left" bgcolor="#FFCC00"|+ || align="center"|G || align="left"|Wyoming || align="center"|2 || align="center"|– || 146 || 4,828 || 500 || 769 || 3,084 || 33.1 || 3.4 || 5.3 || 21.1 || align=center|
|-
|align="left" bgcolor="#FFCC00"|+ || align="center"|F || align="left"|Purdue || align="center"|8 || align="center"|– || 568 || 21,262 || 3,519 || 1,609 || 12,010 || 37.4 || 6.2 || 2.8 || 21.1 || align=center|
|-
|align="left"| || align="center"|G || align="left"|Virginia Tech || align="center"|1 || align="center"| ||  || || || || || || || ||  || align=center|
|-
|align="left" bgcolor="#FFFF99"|^ || align="center"|G || align="left"|Temple || align="center"|2 || align="center"|– || 145 || 2,906 || 300 || 774 || 1,037 || 20.0 || 2.1 || 5.3 || 7.2 || align=center|
|-
|align="left"| || align="center"|G || align="left"|Washington || align="center"|2 || align="center"|– || 69 || 1,023 || 92 || 194 || 389 || 14.8 || 1.3 || 2.8 || 5.6 || align=center|
|-
|align="left"| || align="center"|G || align="left"|SUNY Potsdam || align="center"|1 || align="center"| || 2 || 9 || 1 || 1 || 3 || 4.5 || 0.5 || 0.5 || 1.5 || align=center|
|-
|align="left"| || align="center"|F || align="left"|Tulsa || align="center"|1 || align="center"| || 46 || 632 || 186 || 24 || 91 || 13.7 || 4.0 || 0.5 || 2.0 || align=center|
|-
|align="left"| || align="center"|F/C || align="left"|Colorado State || align="center"|1 || align="center"| || 1 || 11 || 0 || 2 || 0 || 11.0 || 0.0 || 2.0 || 0.0 || align=center|
|}

S

|-
|align="left"| || align="center"|G || align="left"|Miami (FL) || align="center"|2 || align="center"|– || 103 || 3,683 || 362 || 350 || 1,620 || 35.8 || 3.5 || 3.4 || 15.7 || align=center|
|-
|align="left"| || align="center"|F/C || align="left"|California || align="center"|1 || align="center"| || 5 || 8 || 2 || 1 || 0 || 1.6 || 0.4 || 0.2 || 0.0 || align=center|
|-
|align="left"| || align="center"|F/C || align="left"|VCU || align="center"|5 || align="center"|– || 233 || 4,622 || 1,341 || 174 || 1,516 || 19.8 || 5.8 || 0.7 || 6.5 || align=center|
|-
|align="left"| || align="center"|C || align="left"|Saint Vincent || align="center"|2 || align="center"|– || 65 || 813 || 151 || 25 || 239 || 12.5 || 2.3 || 0.4 || 3.7 || align=center|
|-
|align="left"| || align="center"|F/C || align="left"|Syracuse || align="center"|4 || align="center"|– || 218 || 4,308 || 997 || 215 || 1,481 || 19.8 || 4.6 || 1.0 || 6.8 || align=center|
|-
|align="left"| || align="center"|G || align="left"|Nevada || align="center"|3 || align="center"|– || 124 || 3,532 || 413 || 713 || 1,557 || 28.5 || 3.3 || 5.8 || 12.6 || align=center|
|-
|align="left"| || align="center"|G || align="left"|Purdue || align="center"|1 || align="center"| || 1 || 27 || 0 || 2 || 3 || 27.0 || 0.0 || 2.0 || 3.0 || align=center|
|-
|align="left" bgcolor="#FFFF99"|^ || align="center"|F/C || align="left"|Illinois Wesleyan || align="center"|5 || align="center"|– || 392 || 12,236 || 3,087 || 1,143 || 5,253 || 31.2 || 7.9 || 2.9 || 13.4 || align=center|
|-
|align="left"| || align="center"|G/F || align="left"|DePaul || align="center"|2 || align="center"| || 145 || 4,059 || 559 || 252 || 1,533 || 28.0 || 3.9 || 1.7 || 10.6 || align=center|
|-
|align="left"| || align="center"|G || align="left"|Michigan State || align="center"|1 || align="center"| || 13 || 205 || 26 || 45 || 49 || 15.8 || 2.0 || 3.5 || 3.8 || align=center|
|-
|align="left"| || align="center"|F || align="left"|Baylor || align="center"|3 || align="center"| || 125 || 3,106 || 796 || 107 || 883 || 24.8 || 6.4 || 0.9 || 7.1 || align=center|
|-
|align="left"| || align="center"|C || align="left"|Kentucky State || align="center"|2 || align="center"|– || 112 || 3,598 || 1,101 || 127 || 1,505 || 32.1 || 9.8 || 1.1 || 13.4 || align=center|
|-
|align="left"| || align="center"|F || align="left"|Western Kentucky || align="center"|4 || align="center"|– || 271 || 7,740 || 2,266 || 583 || 2,640 || 28.6 || 8.4 || 2.2 || 9.7 || align=center|
|-
|align="left"| || align="center"|G || align="left"|Wake Forest || align="center"|1 || align="center"| || 16 || 138 || 15 || 30 || 38 || 8.6 || 0.9 || 1.9 || 2.4 || align=center|
|-
|align="left"| || align="center"|F/C || align="left"|Colorado State || align="center"|1 || align="center"| || 6 || 40 || 11 || 1 || 13 || 6.7 || 1.8 || 0.2 || 2.2 || align=center|
|-
|align="left"| || align="center"|F || align="left"|Maryland || align="center"|3 || align="center"|– || 194 || 5,406 || 1,414 || 176 || 2,022 || 27.9 || 7.3 || 0.9 || 10.4 || align=center|
|-
|align="left"| || align="center"|G || align="left"|Loyola Marymount || align="center"|1 || align="center"| || 42 || 461 || 32 || 43 || 138 || 11.0 || 0.8 || 1.0 || 3.3 || align=center|
|-
|align="left"| || align="center"|G || align="left"|UNLV || align="center"|1 || align="center"| || 16 || 125 || 9 || 16 || 56 || 7.8 || 0.6 || 1.0 || 3.5 || align=center|
|-
|align="left"| || align="center"|G || align="left"|Marquette || align="center"|1 || align="center"| || 7 || 80 || 7 || 10 || 19 || 11.4 || 1.0 || 1.4 || 2.7 || align=center|
|-
|align="left"| || align="center"|G/F || align="left"|New Mexico || align="center"|3 || align="center"|– || 229 || 5,693 || 546 || 262 || 1,643 || 24.9 || 2.4 || 1.1 || 7.2 || align=center|
|-
|align="left"| || align="center"|G/F || align="left"|North Carolina || align="center"|1 || align="center"| || 42 || 855 || 100 || 70 || 358 || 20.4 || 2.4 || 1.7 || 8.5 || align=center|
|-
|align="left"| || align="center"|G/F || align="left"|Memphis || align="center"|1 || align="center"| || 3 || 15 || 5 || 0 || 7 || 5.0 || 1.7 || 0.0 || 2.3 || align=center|
|-
|align="left"| || align="center"|G || align="left"|Purdue || align="center"|1 || align="center"| || 3 || 6 || 0 || 2 || 6 || 2.0 || 0.0 || 0.7 || 2.0 || align=center|
|-
|align="left"| || align="center"|F || align="left"|Colorado || align="center"|1 || align="center"| || 3 || 25 || 6 || 2 || 11 || 8.3 || 2.0 || 0.7 || 3.7 || align=center|
|-
|align="left"| || align="center"|G/F || align="left"|Arizona State || align="center"|1 || align="center"| || 26 || 259 || 54 || 16 || 92 || 10.0 || 2.1 || 0.6 || 3.5 || align=center|
|-
|align="left"| || align="center"|G || align="left"|Nebraska || align="center"|2 || align="center"|– || 105 || 1,585 || 174 || 205 || 532 || 15.1 || 1.7 || 2.0 || 5.1 || align=center|
|-
|align="left"| || align="center"|F || align="left"|Montana || align="center"|1 || align="center"| || 41 || 271 || 71 || 20 || 78 || 6.6 || 1.7 || 0.5 || 1.9 || align=center|
|-
|align="left"| || align="center"|F || align="left"|Xavier || align="center"|2 || align="center"|– || 90 || 1,470 || 396 || 62 || 600 || 16.3 || 4.4 || 0.7 || 6.7 || align=center|
|}

T to V

|-
|align="left"| || align="center"|G || align="left"|Wake Forest || align="center"|1 || align="center"| ||  || || || || || || || ||  || align=center|
|-
|align="left"| || align="center"|F || align="left"|Bosnia and Herzegovina || align="center"|2 || align="center"|– || 80 || 1,292 || 185 || 58 || 522 || 16.2 || 2.3 || 0.7 || 6.5 || align=center|
|-
|align="left"| || align="center"|G || align="left"|LSU || align="center"|1 || align="center"| || 9 || 83 || 6 || 6 || 17 || 9.2 || 0.7 || 0.7 || 1.9 || align=center|
|-
|align="left"| || align="center"|F || align="left"|Long Beach State || align="center"|2 || align="center"|– || 74 || 725 || 148 || 44 || 135 || 9.8 || 2.0 || 0.6 || 1.8 || align=center|
|-
|align="left"| || align="center"|G || align="left"|Arizona || align="center"|2 || align="center"|– || 125 || 2,179 || 154 || 157 || 473 || 17.4 || 1.2 || 1.3 || 3.8 || align=center|
|-
|align="left"| || align="center"|G/F || align="left"|Bradley || align="center"|1 || align="center"| || 6 || 16 || 2 || 0 || 7 || 2.7 || 0.3 || 0.0 || 1.2 || align=center|
|-
|align="left"| || align="center"|F || align="left"|TCU || align="center"|1 || align="center"| || 70 || 1,049 || 291 || 47 || 210 || 15.0 || 4.2 || 0.7 || 3.0 || align=center|
|-
|align="left"| || align="center"|F || align="left"|Villanova || align="center"|6 || align="center"|– || 385 || 10,491 || 1,632 || 579 || 4,706 || 27.2 || 4.2 || 1.5 || 12.2 || align=center|
|-
|align="left"| || align="center"|G || align="left"|Marquette || align="center"|1 || align="center"| || 73 || 1,983 || 181 || 225 || 780 || 27.2 || 2.5 || 3.1 || 10.7 || align=center|
|-
|align="left"| || align="center"|G/F || align="left"|Tulane || align="center"|1 || align="center"| || 16 || 227 || 42 || 20 || 106 || 14.2 || 2.6 || 1.3 || 6.6 || align=center|
|-
|align="left"| || align="center"|G/F || align="left"|France || align="center"|1 || align="center"| || 2 || 6 || 0 || 0 || 0 || 3.0 || 0.0 || 0.0 || 0.0 || align=center|
|-
|align="left"| || align="center"|F/C || align="left"|Notre Dame || align="center"|1 || align="center"| || 5 || 72 || 9 || 1 || 7 || 14.4 || 1.8 || 0.2 || 1.4 || align=center|
|-
|align="left"| || align="center"|G/F || align="left"|James Madison || align="center"|1 || align="center"| || 2 || 2 || 0 || 0 || 2 || 1.0 || 0.0 || 0.0 || 1.0 || align=center|
|-
|align="left"| || align="center"|F || align="left"|Michigan || align="center"|2 || align="center"|– || 93 || 1,233 || 297 || 58 || 416 || 13.3 || 3.2 || 0.6 || 4.5 || align=center|
|-
|align="left"| || align="center"|F || align="left"|Texas || align="center"|1 || align="center"| ||  || || || || || || || ||  || align=center|
|-
|align="left"| || align="center"|F || align="left"|Turkey || align="center"|1 || align="center"| || 10 || 65 || 23 || 4 || 29 || 6.5 || 2.3 || 0.4 || 2.9 || align=center|
|-
|align="left"| || align="center"|G || align="left"|Memphis || align="center"|1 || align="center"| || 4 || 13 || 3 || 0 || 6 || 3.3 || 0.8 || 0.0 || 1.5 || align=center|
|-
|align="left"| || align="center"|F/C || align="left"|Baylor || align="center"|3 || align="center"|– || 141 || 2,579 || 506 || 100 || 597 || 18.3 || 3.6 || 0.7 || 4.2 || align=center|
|-
|align="left"| || align="center"|G || align="left"|Slovenia || align="center"|2 || align="center"|– || 98 || 1,799 || 180 || 365 || 611 || 18.4 || 1.8 || 3.7 || 6.2 || align=center|
|-
|align="left"| || align="center"|G || align="left"|Croatia || align="center"|1 || align="center"| || 13 || 97 || 3 || 12 || 40 || 7.5 || 0.2 || 0.9 || 3.1 || align=center|
|-
|align="left"| || align="center"|F || align="left"|Utah || align="center"|2 || align="center"|– || 58 || 1,584 || 323 || 78 || 735 || 27.3 || 5.6 || 1.3 || 12.7 || align=center|
|-
|align="left"| || align="center"|G || align="left"|Saint Francis (PA) || align="center"|1 || align="center"| || 38 || 555 || 40 || 158 || 107 || 14.6 || 1.1 || 4.2 || 2.8 || align=center|
|-
|align="left"| || align="center"|G || align="left"|Maryland || align="center"|1 || align="center"| || 23 || 460 || 47 || 91 || 130 || 20.0 || 2.0 || 4.0 || 5.7 || align=center|
|-
|align="left"| || align="center"|G || align="left"|UNLV || align="center"|3 || align="center"|– || 133 || 1,632 || 154 || 74 || 418 || 12.3 || 1.2 || 0.6 || 3.1 || align=center|
|-
|align="left"| || align="center"|F || align="left"|UConn || align="center"|3 || align="center"|– || 193 || 4,908 || 1,214 || 251 || 2,612 || 25.4 || 6.3 || 1.3 || 13.5 || align=center|
|-
|align="left"| || align="center"|C || align="left"|UConn || align="center"|1 || align="center"| || 44 || 386 || 97 || 13 || 98 || 8.8 || 2.2 || 0.3 || 2.2 || align=center|
|}

W to Z

|-
|align="left"| || align="center"|G || align="left"|Marquette || align="center"|4 || align="center"|– || 280 || 4,566 || 322 || 1,035 || 1,236 || 16.3 || 1.2 || 3.7 || 4.4 || align=center|
|-
|align="left"| || align="center"|G/F || align="left"|Pepperdine || align="center"|1 || align="center"| || 3 || 22 || 1 || 1 || 6 || 7.3 || 0.3 || 0.3 || 2.0 || align=center|
|-
|align="left"| || align="center"|F/C || align="left"|Jackson State || align="center"|2 || align="center"|– || 146 || 3,875 || 1,192 || 194 || 1,027 || 26.5 || 8.2 || 1.3 || 7.0 || align=center|
|-
|align="left"| || align="center"|G || align="left"|Saint Joseph's || align="center"|1 || align="center"| || 5 || 27 || 3 || 6 || 10 || 5.4 || 0.6 || 1.2 || 2.0 || align=center|
|-
|align="left"| || align="center"|F || align="left"|Syracuse || align="center"|1 || align="center"| || 48 || 1,024 || 212 || 35 || 490 || 21.3 || 4.4 || 0.7 || 10.2 || align=center|
|-
|align="left"| || align="center"|F/C || align="left"|UCLA || align="center"|1 || align="center"| || 75 || 1,092 || 276 || 55 || 440 || 14.6 || 3.7 || 0.7 || 5.9 || align=center|
|-
|align="left"| || align="center"|G || align="left"|Kansas State || align="center"|2 || align="center"|– || 48 || 409 || 42 || 26 || 94 || 8.5 || 0.9 || 0.5 || 2.0 || align=center|
|-
|align="left"| || align="center"|C || align="left"|Morgan State || align="center"|1 || align="center"| || 15 || 102 || 26 || 3 || 27 || 6.8 || 1.7 || 0.2 || 1.8 || align=center|
|-
|align="left"| || align="center"|G || align="left"|Penn State || align="center"|1 || align="center"| || 15 || 242 || 27 || 27 || 99 || 16.1 || 1.8 || 1.8 || 6.6 || align=center|
|-
|align="left"| || align="center"|G || align="left"|Czech Republic || align="center"|1 || align="center"| || 58 || 866 || 111 || 62 || 251 || 14.9 || 1.9 || 1.1 || 4.3 || align=center|
|-
|align="left"| || align="center"|C || align="left"|Kansas || align="center"|1 || align="center"| || 41 || 214 || 55 || 11 || 88 || 5.2 || 1.3 || 0.3 || 2.1 || align=center|
|-
|align="left"| || align="center"|F/C || align="left"|Old Dominion || align="center"|1 || align="center"| || 1 || 6 || 1 || 0 || 2 || 6.0 || 1.0 || 0.0 || 2.0 || align=center|
|-
|align="left"| || align="center"|F || align="left"|South Alabama || align="center"|1 || align="center"| || 8 || 45 || 8 || 1 || 16 || 5.6 || 1.0 || 0.1 || 2.0 || align=center|
|-
|align="left"| || align="center"|F/C || align="left"|Xavier || align="center"|1 || align="center"| || 15 || 72 || 19 || 0 || 24 || 4.8 || 1.3 || 0.0 || 1.6 || align=center|
|-
|align="left"| || align="center"|F || align="left"|North Carolina || align="center"|1 || align="center"| ||  || || || || || || || ||  || align=center|
|-
|align="left"| || align="center"|G || align="left"|Alabama || align="center"|4 || align="center"|– || 272 || 8,667 || 946 || 1,549 || 3,828 || 31.9 || 3.5 || 5.7 || 14.1 || align=center|
|-
|align="left"| || align="center"|G || align="left"|West Virginia || align="center"|2 || align="center"|– || 117 || 1,656 || 112 || 224 || 592 || 14.2 || 1.0 || 1.9 || 5.1 || align=center|
|-
|align="left"| || align="center"|G || align="left"|Iowa || align="center"|2 || align="center"|– || 66 || 672 || 116 || 64 || 255 || 10.2 || 1.8 || 1.0 || 3.9 || align=center|
|-
|align="left"| || align="center"|F/C || align="left"|North Carolina || align="center"|3 || align="center"|– || 139 || 2,789 || 824 || 63 || 937 || 20.1 || 5.9 || 0.5 || 6.7 || align=center|
|-
|align="left"| || align="center"|F || align="left"|Michigan || align="center"|4 || align="center"|– || 70 || 953 || 232 || 55 || 301 || 13.6 || 3.3 || 0.8 || 4.3 || align=center|
|-
|align="left"| || align="center"|G || align="left"|Louisiana || align="center"|1 || align="center"| || 3 || 14 || 4 || 2 || 8 || 4.7 || 1.3 || 0.7 || 2.7 || align=center|
|-
|align="left"| || align="center"|F || align="left"|Houston || align="center"|1 || align="center"| || 7 || 45 || 7 || 2 || 7 || 6.4 || 1.0 || 0.3 || 1.0 || align=center|
|-
|align="left" bgcolor="#FFCC00"|+ (#32)''' || align="center"|G/F || align="left"|South Carolina || align="center"|8 || align="center"|– || 582 || 18,422 || 1,550 || 2,479 || 9,743 || 31.7 || 2.7 || 4.3 || 16.7 || align=center|
|-
|align="left"| || align="center"|F/C || align="left"|North Carolina || align="center"|1 || align="center"| || 56 || 525 || 112 || 20 || 95 || 9.4 || 2.0 || 0.4 || 1.7 || align=center|
|-
|align="left"| || align="center"|G || align="left"|South Dakota State || align="center"|2 || align="center"|– || 69 || 1,451 || 165 || 197 || 442 || 21.0 || 2.4 || 2.9 || 6.4 || align=center|
|-
|align="left"| || align="center"|F || align="left"|UNLV || align="center"|1 || align="center"| || 13 || 62 || 20 || 2 || 37 || 4.8 || 1.5 || 0.2 || 2.8 || align=center|
|-
|align="left"| || align="center"|F || align="left"|Nevada || align="center"|1 || align="center"| || 46 || 240 || 27 || 13 || 57 || 5.2 || 0.6 || 0.3 || 1.2 || align=center|
|-
|align="left"| || align="center"|F || align="left"|Notre Dame || align="center"|1 || align="center"| || 8 || 78 || 9 || 3 || 43 || 9.8 || 1.1 || 0.4 || 5.4 || align=center|
|-
|align="left"| || align="center"|G || align="left"|Oral Roberts || align="center"|2 || align="center"|– || 52 || 1,063 || 119 || 216 || 266 || 20.4 || 2.3 || 4.2 || 5.1 || align=center|
|-
|align="left"| || align="center"|F || align="left"|Dayton || align="center"|1 || align="center"| || 8 || 126 || 20 || 5 || 48 || 15.8 || 2.5 || 0.6 || 6.0 || align=center|
|-
|align="left"|Yi Jianlian || align="center"|F || align="left"|China || align="center"|1 || align="center"| || 66 || 1,647 || 344 || 55 || 566 || 25.0 || 5.2 || 0.8 || 8.6 || align=center|
|-
|align="left"| || align="center"|G || align="left"|Wake Forest || align="center"|1 || align="center"| || 7 || 77 || 5 || 12 || 24 || 11.0 || 0.7 || 1.7 || 3.4 || align=center|
|-
|align="left"| || align="center"|F/C || align="left"|North Carolina || align="center"|1 || align="center"| || 24 || 406 || 111 || 19 || 141 || 16.9 || 4.6 || 0.8 || 5.9 || align=center|
|-
|align="left"| || align="center"|G || align="left"|Duquesne || align="center"|1 || align="center"| || 53 || 398 || 46 || 73 || 118 || 7.5 || 0.9 || 1.4 || 2.2 || align=center|
|}

References

External links
Bucks Media Guide pp. 116-117
Milwaukee Bucks all-time roster
Bucks Alphabetical roster

National Basketball Association all-time rosters
 
Roster